Iwashiro may refer to:

Iwashiro Province, a former province of Japan
Iwashiro, Fukushima, a former town in Adachi District, Fukushima Prefecture, Japan
Iwashiro Station, a railway station in Wakayama Prefecture, Japan

People with the surname
, Japanese composer
, Japanese manga artist

Japanese-language surnames